Lac d'Anterne is a lake near Sixt-Fer-à-Cheval, in the commune of Passy in the Haute-Savoie department of France. It is located in the Sixt-Passy nature preserve.

Anterne
Auvergne-Rhône-Alpes region articles needing translation from French Wikipedia